Phebalium bifidum is a species of small, erect shrub that is endemic to the Capertee Valley in New South Wales. It is more or less covered with glossy scales and has bilobed leaves and cream-coloured to bright yellow flowers arranged in umbels on the ends of branchlets.

Description
Flowering occurs from August to October.

Taxonomy and naming
Phebalium bifidum was first formally described in 2004 by Peter Weston and Margaret Turton in the journal Telopea from specimens collected in the Capertee Valley in 2003.

Distribution and habitat
This phebalium grows in woodland and heath. It is only known from the Capertee Valley.

Conservation status
Phebalium bifidum is classified as "endangered" under the New South Wales Government Biodiversity Conservation Act 2016.

References

bifidum
Flora of New South Wales
Plants described in 2004